Georgi Rikov (1946–2002) was a Bulgarian linguist and scientist.

1946 births
2002 deaths
Linguists from Bulgaria
Bulgarian scientists
People from Pazardzhik
20th-century linguists